The Citizens Coinage Advisory Committee (or CCAC) was established in 2003 to advise the United States Secretary of the Treasury on coinage-related issues, replacing the Citizens Commemorative Coin Advisory Committee (CCCAC).

See also 
 Citizens' Stamp Advisory Committee

External links

 

United States Department of the Treasury
Numismatics
United States federal boards, commissions, and committees
2003 in the United States